International Track & Field 2000 is a track and field game for PlayStation in 1999 and Nintendo 64 in 2000. Versions were also released for the Sega Dreamcast, PlayStation 2, and Game Boy Color as ESPN International Track & Field in North America. Maurice Greene (sprinter), a former men's WR holder in the 100M dash, is the cover athlete.

Reception

The PlayStation 2 and Dreamcast versions received "mixed or average reviews" according to the review aggregation website Metacritic. In Japan, Famitsu gave it a score of 30 out of 40 for the PlayStation version, 29 out of 40 for the N64 version, and 25 out of 40 for the Game Boy Color version. The earliest reviews of the game came from Nintendo Power, which gave the N64 version a score of 7.3 out of 10 in the March 2000 edition, and from GameFan and Game Informer, which gave it favorable reviews respectively in their April 2000 edition, even though the game itself was not out until months later. Jes Bickham of N64 Magazine gave the same console version 86% months before its European release, saying, "The defiantly 'old-skool' (ahem) gameplay may be the simplest you'll ever experience, but it just goes to show what a winning formula Konami came up with all those years ago -- and they've done their legacy proud." GamePro said of the PlayStation 2 version, "You've probably played this game before-or at least one that's extremely similar. Yet you've never seen it look so good-in most events you can make out details of individuals in the crowd. If you're a fan of track & field extravaganzas, or [you] just love multiplayer button-mashing, be sure to put this event into your personal decathlon."

Eric Bratcher of NextGen said of the PlayStation version in its March 2000 issue, "If you want Track & Field, this is it. That's a pretty big if, though." Ten months later, in the magazine's January 2001 issue, Kevin Rice said of the PS2 version, "For those who have a serious itch to play an Olympics game this year, this is the best of the crop. But it's still only adequate."

The PlayStation 2 version was a runner-up for the "Best Sports Game" award at the Official U.S. PlayStation Magazine 2000 Editors' Awards, which went to Madden NFL 2001.

See also
ESPN International Winter Sports 2002

Notes

References

External links

1999 video games
Game Boy Color games
Nintendo 64 games
PlayStation (console) games
Olympic video games
PlayStation 2 games
Dreamcast games
Athletics video games
Video games developed in Japan